Shweta Kawatra (born 10 February 1976) is an Indian actress, model and television presenter.

Personal life 
She is married to TV actor Manav Gohil. They participated in the dance competition show Nach Baliye where Manav was awarded best dancer by Saroj Khan. After eight years of marriage, the couple became parents to a daughter, Zahara Tabeetha, (born on 11 May 2012). Kawatra practices Buddhism and is a member of the Soka Gakkai. She is best known for her role as Pallavi Agarwal in Kahaani Ghar Ghar Kii and as Nivedita Mittal in Kumkum – Ek Pyara Sa Bandhan. She has had appearances in many other TV serials, most notably in C.I.D.. She appears in Sawal E Ishq to answer love questions on fame Bollywood. She played Bhayankar Pari in Baal Veer.

Filmography

Television
 Saturday Suspense as Sumita Chopra (Episode 98)
 Star Bestsellers - Masoom as Advocate (Episode 25)
 Mausam
 Ghar Ek Mandir as Mala
 Thriller At 10 - Hotel as Sonia Malhotra (Episode 116 - Episode 120)
 Kahaani Ghar Ghar Kii as Pallavi Bhandari / Pallavi Kamal Agarwal 
 Rishtey - Aank Micholi as Anu (Episode 142)
 Koshish
 Kkusum as Esha Chopra / Esha Puri 
 Miss India 
 Krishna Arjun as Maria (Episode 44 - Episode 47)
 C.I.D. as Dr. Niyati Pradhan (from Episode 139)
 Ye Meri Life Hai
 Jassi Jaissi Koi Nahin as Meenakshi 
 CID: Special Bureau as Dr. Niyati Pradhan 
 Saat Phere: Saloni Ka Safar as Reva Sehgal 
 Fear Factor India as Contestant 
 Jeena Isi Ka Naam Hai as Guest (Episode 7)
 Kumkum – Ek Pyara Sa Bandhan as Nivedita Mittal
Baal Veer as Bhayankar Pari ( 2014 - 2015)
 Sawal E Ishq as Shweta Kawatra
 Nach Baliye 2 as Contestant 
 Soni Mahiwal as Soni
 Sonu Sweety as Sweety
 Gaadi Bula Rahi Hai 
 Adaalat as Advocate Surveen Khurana 
 Phulwa as SSP Amrita Tiwari
 Tyohaar Ki Thaali as Guest
 Karrle Tu Bhi Mohabbat as Radhika Awasthi

References

External links 

 
 
 Sonu Sweety

Indian film actresses
Indian women television presenters
Indian television presenters
Female models from Delhi
Living people
Indian Buddhists
Nichiren Buddhists
Converts to Sōka Gakkai
1966 births